David Karlsson (born 24 April 1981) is a Swedish bandy player who currently plays for Villa Lidköping BK as a striker.  David has played for Sweden's national team since the 2004–05 season and impressed during the Bandy World Championship 2007 by scoring 16 goals.

External links
 
 
 David Karlsson at Villa Lidköpng BK 

1981 births
Living people
Swedish bandy players
Expatriate bandy players in Russia
Swedish expatriate sportspeople in Russia
Hammarby IF Bandy players
Uralsky Trubnik players
Zorky Krasnogorsk players
Villa Lidköping BK players
Vetlanda BK players
Sweden international bandy players
Bandy World Championship-winning players